Zehetner is a surname. Notable people with the surname include:

Brian Zehetner, American nutritionist
Günther Zehetner, Austrian scientist and scientific director of the former German Resource Center for Genome Research
Johann Zehetner (1912–1942), Austrian field handball player
Leopold I. Zehetner, provost of St. Florian monastery, officiated 1612-1646
Nora Zehetner (born 1981), American actress

German-language surnames